His or Her Majesty's New Zealand Ship (HMNZS) is the ship prefix used to identify warships and shore facilities commissioned into the Royal New Zealand Navy (RNZN).

It derives from "His Majesty's Ship" (HMS) used in the United Kingdom. The British monarch is also equally and separately the New Zealand head of state. Should the monarch be female, the designation also changes to "Her" rather than "His" Majesty.

On 1 October 1941, King George VI fixed his signature to the approval for the Royal New Zealand Navy and from that date all ships officially received the designation.

See also
List of ships of the Royal New Zealand Navy

Royal New Zealand Navy
Ship prefixes